Galbraith Lake is a lake located in the North Slope Borough of Alaska, United States.  The surrounding area is uninhabited except for seasonal residents.

The lake is located on the west side of the Dalton Highway between miles 272-75 of the highway. A campground is also located near the lake.

The lake was named in 1951 after Bart Galbraith, a bush pilot who died in a 1950 plane crash while flying from Barter Island to Barrow.

Galbraith Lake Airport is located in the area, as well as Pump Station 4 of the Trans-Alaska Pipeline System.

A work camp was located at Galbraith Lake during the construction of the pipeline.  An oil spill near the camp in 1975 caused some oil to enter the lake and a slick to appear on its surface.  Clean up efforts were then conducted.

The infrastructure of the pipeline construction project in the 1970s also permitted the conduct of archeological investigations in the area, which previously had not been explored, funded by the Alyeska Pipeline Service Company.

Campground
The Galbraith Lake Bureau of Land Management Campground is 359 miles north of Fairbanks and 140 miles south of Deadhorse at the 275 mile mark.

Climate
Galbraith Lake has a cold subarctic climate, bordering on a true tundra climate. Snow has occurred in all three summer months.  During the construction of the Alaska Pipeline a weather station was operated at the construction site. Because the weather station was operated for only a decade, the temperature record is irregular, with December the coldest month of the year, and record highs and lows less extreme than those of nearby locations.  Likewise, the precipitation record is incomplete, with some months having less than ten years of record.

Prior names

Alternate prior names for the lake were "Natravak Lake" and "Sagavanirktok Lake."  "Natravak" is an Eskimo name for "big lake" and a common name in northern Alaska.

References

Lakes of Alaska
Bodies of water of North Slope Borough, Alaska